The Mandarin Store and Post Office, officially known as the Mandarin Museum and also known as the Walter Jones Store and Post Office Museum, is a historic site in Jacksonville, Florida, United States. It is located at 12471 Mandarin Road. On October 1, 2001, it was added to the U.S. National Register of Historic Places.

The general store was in operation from 1911 until 1964, and is operated as a museum by the Mandarin Museum & Historical Society. The museum features some of the store's original furnishings and period memorabilia, and is open twice a month.

See also 
List of United States post offices

References

External links 

 
 The Walter Jones Store and Museum at Florida's Office of Cultural and Historical Programs

History of Jacksonville, Florida
Museums in Jacksonville, Florida
National Register of Historic Places in Jacksonville, Florida
Historical society museums in Florida
History museums in Florida
Vernacular architecture in Florida
Commercial buildings completed in 1911
1911 establishments in Florida